"Passionfruit" is a song by Canadian rapper and singer Drake from his playlist mixtape More Life (2017). The song was written by Drake along with producer Wheezy, and has additional vocals from Zoë Kravitz. "Passionfruit" was released on March 28, 2017, as the second single released from More Life after "Fake Love". It has been covered by Paramore, Mabel, Benny Sings, Yaeji, Cornelius, John Mayer, and Ben Tankard.

Composition
"Passionfruit" has been characterized as tropical house, R&B, pop, and dancehall. It is performed in the key of G minor in common time with a tempo of 112 beats per minute. Drake's vocals span from F2 to G3.

Commercial performance
"Passionfruit" entered the top ten of the charts in Canada, Denmark, Ireland, New Zealand, the United Kingdom, and the United States.

The song debuted at number 8 on the US Billboard Hot 100 on the issue dated April 8, 2017. This was the last song of the 431 weeks simultaneously on the chart for Drake. This record never broke after "Passionfruit" dropped off the chart.  In Drake's native Canada, it debuted at number 2 on the Canadian Hot 100 behind Ed Sheeran's "Shape of You".

Charts

Weekly charts

Year-end charts

Certifications

Release history

References

2017 singles
2017 songs
Cash Money Records singles
Drake (musician) songs
Songs written by Drake (musician)
Young Money Entertainment singles
OVO Sound singles
Dancehall songs
Reggae fusion songs
Tropical house songs